They Poured Fire on Us From the Sky: The True Story of Three Lost Boys of Sudan (2005) is a book co-authored with Judy A. Bernstein. It's the autobiographical story of brothers Benson Deng and Alephonsion Deng, and their cousin Benjamin Ajak. It describes their ordeal during the Second Sudanese Civil War as they flee as refugees across Sudan, Ethiopia, and Kenya before they make it to a refugee camp in Kenya. There they sign up to take part in the Lost Boys of Sudan program and resettle in America.

Editions
 Hardcover, first edition (2005). 
 Paperback (2006). 
 Audiobook, Audible.com (2009).

References

1994 nb

External links
They Poured Fire on Us From the Sky, official book site.

Lost Boys of Sudan
2005 non-fiction books
Books about refugees